Ramsey Heights is a village in Ramsey  civil parish, part of the Huntingdonshire district of Cambridgeshire, England.

Despite its name, the village is low-lying and straddles the zero-metre contour line in the flat fenland.

History 
In October 2015, a dig to recover a WW2 Spitfire fighter plane was carried at Holme Fen. The dig's project director was Stephen Macauley of Oxford Archaeology East (OAE). A film of the dig was shown at the Great Fen's Countryside Centre, Ramsey Heights on 27 September 2019.

Notable residents
Sybil Marshall (1913–2005), writer, academic and social historian was born in the village.

References

Villages in Cambridgeshire
Ramsey, Cambridgeshire